The non-marine molluscs of Colombia are a part of the molluscan fauna of Colombia.

There are 559 species of non-marine molluscs living in the wild in Colombia.

There are a total of ??? species of gastropods, which breaks down to ?? species of freshwater gastropods, and ??? species of land gastropods in 82 genera, plus ?? species of bivalves living in the wild.

There are 20 non-indigenous species of gastropods (? freshwater and 20 land species: 13 snails and 7 slugs) and ? species of bivalves in the wild in Colombia. This is a total of ? freshwater non-indigenous species of wild molluscs.

The non-marine mollusc fauna of Colombia is not fully surveyed yet. There are still 6 departments of Colombia, especially in the southwest, from which there are no records of land gastropods yet (as of 2008).

Summary table of number of species

Freshwater gastropods
Ampullariidae
 Marisa Gray, [1824]
 Pomacea Perry, 1811

Land gastropods 
There are 80 genera (79 genera in this list) of land gastropods in (continental) Colombia.

Helicinidae
 Alcadia (Microalcadia) - 4 species in Colombia
 Alcadia novogranadensis Hausdorf, 2006

Cyclophoridae Gray, 1847
 Cyclotus Swainson, 1840
 Calacyclotus Bartsch, 1942
 Filocyclus Bartsch, 1942

Neocyclotidae Kobelt & Möllendorff, 1897
 Aperostoma Troschel, 1847

 Buckleyia Higgins, 1872
 Calaperostoma Pilsbry, H. A., [1935]
 Poteria Gray, 1850
 Neocyclotus Fischer & Crosse H., 1886

Arionidae Gray, 1840
 Arion Férussac, 1819
 Arion intermedius Normand, 1852 - introduced

Veronicellidae
 Sarasinula marginata (Semper, 1885)

Philomycidae Gray, 1847
 Philomycus Rafinesque, 1820

Scolodontidae Baker, [1925] (include Systrophiidae Thiele, 1926)
 Hirtudiscus Hylton-Scott, 1973
 Hirtudiscus boyacensis Hausdorf, 2003
 Hirtudiscus comatus Hausdorf, 2003
 Hirtudiscus curei Hausdorf, 2003
 Hirtudiscus hirtus Hylton Scott, 1973
 Systrophia Pfeiffer, 1855
 Guestieria Crosse H., 1872
 Happia Bourguignat, 1889
 Miradiscops Baker, [1925]

Camaenidae Pilsbry, H. A., 1895
 Isomeria Albers, 1850

Pleurodontidae
 Labyrinthus Beck, 1837
 Pleurodonte Fischer von Waldheim, 1807
 Solaropsis Beck, 1837

Helicidae Rafinesque, 1815
 Helix L., 1758
 Cornu aspersum (O. F. Müller, 1774) - introduced (not counted as genus in this list)

Xanthonychidae Strebel & Pfeiffer, 1879
 Leptarionta Crosse H. & Fischer, 1872

Euconulidae Baker, 1928
 Habroconus Fischer & Crosse H., 1872

Agriolimacidae Wagner, 1935
 Deroceras Rafinesque, 1820
 Deroceras laeve (O. F. Müller, 1774) - introduced
 Deroceras panormitanum (Lessona & Pollonera, 1882) - introduced
 Deroceras reticulatum (O. F. Müller, 1774) - introduced

Boettgerillidae Van Goethem, 1972
 Boettgerilla Simroth, 1910
 Boettgerilla pallens Simroth, 1912 - introduced

Limacidae Rafinesque, 1815
 Lehmannia Heynemann, 1863
 Lehmannia valentiana (A. Férussac, 1822) - introduced
 Limax L., 1758

Polygyridae Pilsbry, H. A., 1894
 Giffordius Pilsbry, H. A., 1930

Thysanophoridae Pilsbry, H. A., 1926
 Thysanophora Strebel & Pfeffer, 1880

Sagdidae Pilsbry, H. A., 1895
 Lacteoluna Pilsbry, H. A., 1926

Succineidae Beck, 1837
 Succinea Draparnaud, 1805
 Omalonyx Orbigny, 1841

Milacidae Ellis, 1926
 Milax Gray, 1855
 Milax gagates (Draparnaud, 1801) - introduced

Pristilomatidae
 Hawaiia minuscula (Binney, 1840) - introduced

Vitrinidae Fitzinger, 1833
 Hawaiia Gude, 1911
 Oxychilus Fitzinger, 1833
 Oxychilus alliarius (Miller, 1822) - introduced
 Vitrea Fitzinger, 1833
 Vitrea contracta (Westerlund, 1871) - introduced

Zonitidae Mörch, 1864
 Hyalinia Agassiz, 1837

Achatinidae Swainson, 1840
 Achatina Lamarck, 1799

Ferussaciidae
 Cecilioides Ferussac, 1814

Subulinidae Crosse H. & Fischer, 1877
 Subulina Beck, 1837
 Leptinaria Beck, 1837
 Opeas Albers, 1850
 Obeliscos Beck, 1837
 Rhodea barcrofti Pilsbry, 1958
 Rhodea gigantea Mousson, 1873
 Rhodea mariaalejandrae ..., 2007
 Rhodea moussoni ..., 2007
 Synapterpes Pilsbry, H. A., 1896

Orthalicidae
 Bulimulus Leach, 1814
 Simpulopsis Beck, 1837
 Thaumastus Albers, 1860
 Naesiotus Albers, 1850
 Drymaeus Albers, 1850
 Auris Spix, 1827
 Dryptus Albers, 1860
 Stenostylus Pilsbry, H. A., 1898
 Plekocheilus Guilding, 1828
 Orthalicus Beck, 1837
 Corona Albers, 1850
 Hemibulimus Martens, E. von., 1885
 Porphyrobaphe Shuttleworth, 1856
 Sultana Shuttleworth, 1856

Cerionidae Pilsbry, H. A., 1901
 Cerion Röding, 1798

Urocoptidae Pilsbry, 1898 (1868)
 Microceramus Pilsbry, H. A. & Vanatta, 1898

Clausiliidae Mörch, 1864
 Clausilia Draparnaud, 1805
 Nenia Adams, H. & Adams, 1855
 Columbinia Polinski, 1924

Spiraxidae Baker, 1939
 Euglandina Fischer & Crosse H., 1870
 Pseudosubulina Strebel & Pfeffer, 1882

Charopidae Hutton, [1884]
 Radiodiscus Pilsbry, H. A. & Ferris, [1906]
 Lilloiconcha Weyrauch, 1965
 Lilloiconcha gordurasensis (Thiele, 1927)
 Lilloiconcha costulata Hausdorf, 2005
 Lilloiconcha laevigata Hausdorf, 2005

Punctidae Morse, 1864
 Paralaoma Iredale, [1913]
 Paralaoma servilis (Shuttleworth, 1852) - introduced

Streptaxidae Gray, 1806
 Hypselartemon Wenz, 1947
 Streptaxis Gray, 1837
 Streptostele Dohrn, 1866

Strophocheilidae Thiele, 1926
 Strophocheilus Spix, 1827
 Megalobulimus Miller, 1878

Pupillidae Turton, 1831
 Pupoides Pfeiffer, [1854]

Vertiginidae Fitzinger, 1833
 Gastrocopta Wollaston, 1878
 Vertigo Müller, 1774
 Pupisoma Stoliczka, 1873

Strobilopsidae Pilsbry, H. A., 1893
 Strobilops Pilsbry, H. A., 1893

Valloniidae Morse, 1864
 Vallonia Risso, 1826

Freshwater bivalves

See also
Lists of molluscs of surrounding countries:
 List of non-marine molluscs of Panama
 List of non-marine molluscs of Venezuela
 List of non-marine molluscs of Brazil
 List of non-marine molluscs of Ecuador
 List of non-marine molluscs of Peru

Other nearby countries:
 List of non-marine molluscs of Jamaica
 List of non-marine molluscs of Haiti
 List of non-marine molluscs of the Dominican Republic
 List of non-marine molluscs of Honduras
 List of non-marine molluscs of Nicaragua
 List of non-marine molluscs of Costa Rica

References

Further reading

M
Colombia
Molluscs
Colombia
Colombia
Colombia